
Mawukura (1924–2013) was an Australian Aboriginal artist.

Life and career
Mawukura was a Walmadjari man. His country is around Wayampajarti, a permanent waterhole in the north-western area of the Great Sandy Desert in Western Australia. 

His works have been sold to overseas collectors and are represented in the National Gallery of Australia and many other collections.

Exhibitions 

Solo shows
1999 Artplace, Perth
1994 Artplace, Perth
1994 Reflections of the Kimberley Gallery, Derby, WA
1993 Gallery Gabrielle Pizzi, Melbourne
2001 Artplace, Perth
2003 Cooee Gallery Sydney
2003 Artplace, Perth
2004 45 Downstairs Gallery, Melbourne
2005 Artplace, Perth
2005 Raft Artspace, Darwin

Group shows

1999 Selected to hang in 16th National Aboriginal & Torres Strait Islander Art Awards, Darwin, Northern Territory
1999 Aboriginal Kunst aus West Australien, Galerie Gaswerk, Germany
1999 Cooee Gallery Sydney with Peter Skipper
1994 ACAF-4, Fourth Australian Contemporary Art Fair, Melbourne
1994 Eight Western Australian Artists, The Blaxland Gallery, Sydney
1994 City of Gosnells Art Award, Art Prize
2001 Ngurrara Canvas National Gallery of Australia
2001 Framed Gallery, Darwin
2001 Cooee Gallery Sydney with Peter Skipper
2016 Billabong Dreams, Seattle Art Museum

Collections 
Levy Kaplan Collection, Seattle, USA
Thomas Vroom Collection, Amsterdam
National Gallery of Australia
Art Gallery of Western Australia
Gallery Gabrielle Pizzi
Ian & Sue Bernadt Collections
Wesfarmers Ltd

References

Further reading
1994 Road O'Brien Playful Air to Dottiness of Bushcapes  The West Australian, 19 May 1994
1995 Anna King Murdoch Late Starter Tells Desert Story in Bright Acrylics The Age 3 December 1995
1998 Jila Painted Waters of the Great Sandy Desert Video documentary / SBS Television

1920s births
2013 deaths
Australian Aboriginal artists
Australian contemporary painters
Indigenous Australians from Western Australia
People from the Kimberley (Western Australia)